The Harley-Davidson Topper was the only motor scooter that the Harley-Davidson Motor Company ever produced.

Design and specifications
The Topper had a  single-cylinder two-stroke engine mounted horizontally between the floorboards. The engine required a premixed gasoline/oil mixture. The starter was of the rope-recoil type similar to lawn mowers or the Lambretta E model.  Unlike most scooters with enclosed engines, the Topper's engine did not have a cooling fan. It was expected that the low, horizontally mounted engine would be cooled by air passing under the scooter, but some Toppers developed overheating problems.  The engine used a reed valve in its induction system.

The engine powered a continuously variable transmission called "Scootaway Drive" that included a safety device that did not allow the scooter to move from rest at engine speeds higher than 1800 rpm.  Final drive was by an exposed roller chain.

The Topper had 5 inch internal expanding drum brakes on both wheels. The front brake was controlled by a hand lever on the left handlebar with a parking brake lock; the rear brake was controlled by a pedal.

The front body, front fender and floorboards of the Topper were made of stamped steel, and the engine cover and body were made of molded fiberglass. Storage space was provided under the seat; the manufacturer suggested storing extra containers of two-stroke oil there.

Development
The main complaint from Topper owners was with the "Scootaway Drive" continuously variable transmission. Road grime would get into the transmission and cause the belt to slip. A new transmission, with the primary drive sealed in an oil bath, was introduced for 1961.

The Topper H was introduced in 1961 (sold through 1965) with a new alloy cylinder head that increased the compression ratio to 8.0:1, a reusable foam air filter, and revisions to the cylinder ports and air intake tube.

This was advertised as the "Topper U". The detuned Topper was made to comply with laws in some states in the United States that allowed motorcycles with rated engine power below a stated maximum to be operated without a license or to be operated on a special license by riders at a younger age than would be allowed a regular motorcycle license.

A Topper was used by the Milwaukee Brewers as a bullpen car from 1959 through 1995.

Performance
In 1959 a Topper was ridden from Bakersfield, California to Death Valley and back without repair or adjustments requiring tools. It then returned to Bakersfield.

See also
Zündapp Bella – a German scooter with similar front suspension and cooling system
List of motorcycles of the 1950s
 List of motor scooter manufacturers and brands

Notes

References
Print

Online

Topper
Motor scooters
Motorcycles introduced in 1961